Rashed Nawaf (born 1 June 2005) is a Qatari tennis player. He has a career high ATP doubles ranking of 1591 achieved on 17 January  2022 and atp singles ranking of 1886 achieved on 18 October 2021 . Since 2018, Nawaf trains at Patrick Mouratoglou Academy. He made his ATP main draw debut at the 2020 Qatar ExxonMobil Open in the doubles draw partnering Malek Jaziri. Nawaf also represents Qatar at the Davis Cup, where he has a W/L record of 1–2. He had promising results as a junior, winning the Asian 14&under Championships and finished as runner-up at the Junior Orange Bowl and les petits as.

References

External links
 
 
 

2005 births
Living people
Qatari male tennis players